Wakoná (Aconã) is an extinct and unattested, presumed language of eastern Brazil. The dispersed ethnic population numbered an estimated 500 to 1,000 in 1995.

Wakoná was originally spoken around Lagoa Comprida and in Penedo. Loukotka (1968) reported that the remaining ethnic descendants who speak only Portuguese could be found in the city of Porto Real do Colégio. They lived near Palmeira dos Índios according to Meader (1978).

References

Unattested languages of South America
Extinct languages of South America
Indigenous languages of Northeastern Brazil